Birds in Peru is a 1968 French film. It was written and directed by Romain Gary. Gary based it on his own story.

Cast
Jean Seberg as Adriana
Maurice Ronet as Rainier
Pierre Brasseur as Husband
Danielle Darrieux as Madame Fernande
Jean-Pierre Kalfon as Chauffeur

References

External links
Birds in Peru at IMDb
Birds in Peru at Letterbox DVD

1968 films
1968 drama films
French drama films
1960s French-language films
Films based on works by Romain Gary
Films set in Peru
Films about sex addiction
1960s French films